Tim McGraw is the debut album by American country music artist Tim McGraw, released on April 20, 1993. It includes the singles "What Room Was the Holiday In", "Welcome to the Club", "Two Steppin' Mind", and "Memory Lane", none of which reached the Top 40 on the country charts. This is the only studio album of McGraw's career not to achieve a music recording sales certification or to enter the Top Country Albums charts.

Content
The album's lead single, "What Room Was the Holiday In", was produced by Doug Johnson; the rest of the album was produced by Byron Gallimore (who has produced all of McGraw's subsequent work) and James Stroud.

The tracks "Memory Lane" and "Tears in the Rain" were co-written by Joe Diffie, the former had been recorded by Keith Palmer on his debut album, while Diffie recorded his own version of "Tears in the Rain" for his 1995 album Life's So Funny. "The Only Thing That I Have Left" had been recorded by George Strait on his Strait from the Heart album.

Critical reception

Brian Mansfield and Thom Jurek of Allmusic rated the album two and a half stars out of five, saying that it was not memorable aside from three of its singles, but that it showed the "roots of [his] individuality".

Track listing

Personnel 
 Tim McGraw – lead vocals
 Gary Prim – pianos, synthesizers
 Larry Byrom – acoustic guitar
 Mark Casstevens – acoustic guitar, electric guitar
 Chris Leuzinger – electric guitar 
 Brent Rowan – electric guitar
 Sonny Garrish – dobro, steel guitar
 Jimmy Carter – bass 
 Glenn Worf – bass
 Paul Leim – drums 
 James Stroud – drums
 Glen Duncan – fiddle
 Rob Hajacos – fiddle (9)
 Kirk "Jelly Roll" Johnson – harmonica (9)
 James King – backing vocals 
 Curtis Wright – backing vocals
 Curtis Young – backing vocals

Production 
 James Stroud – producer
 Byron Gallimore – producer (1-8, 10)
 Doug Johnson – producer (9)
 Julian King – recording, additional recording, mix assistant 
 Lynn Peterzell – recording, mixing
 David Hall – assistant engineer, mix assistant 
 Milan Bogdan – digital editing
 Glenn Meadows – mastering 
 Masterfonics (Nashville, Tennessee) – editing and mastering location
 Neuman, Walker & Associates (Los Angeles, California) – art direction, design 
 Jim "Señor" McGuire – photography
 Image Management Group – management

Chart performance

Singles

References

1993 debut albums
Tim McGraw albums
Curb Records albums
Albums produced by Byron Gallimore
Albums produced by James Stroud